Green Square is an affluent inner-southern locality of Sydney, New South Wales, Australia. The locale is at a five way intersection where the four suburbs of Alexandria, Zetland, Waterloo, and Beaconsfield meet. Its upscale neighbourhood, famous cafes, restaurants, health and wellness amenities cater to well-to-do shoppers and diners. The precincts are linked by Ebsworth Street, Sydney’s first new high street in a century, and Zetland Avenue west, a new tree-lined boulevard inspired by avenues in Manhattan with a long row of aligned traffic lights.

The Green Square Town Centre is undergoing one of the largest urban renewal projects undertaken in Australia. The urban renewal project, spanning 278 hectares, received criticism for having population peak at around 60,000 residents and 21,000 workers by 2030.

However, this level of population density would not rank in the top 200 densely populated districts in the world. At 21,500 residents per square kilometre in the year 2030, Green Square's population density would be approximately one-third of Yorkville on the Upper East Side of Manhattan at over 60,000 residents per square kilometre, one-half of the Roquette district in Paris at over 40,000 residents per square kilometre, and in line with Tribeca or Midtown Manhattan at approximately 20,000 residents per square kilometre.

Precincts
Green Square Town Centre has been awarded a 6 Star Green Star from Green building in Australia (GBCA), because it reached a high standard of governance, liveability, economic prosperity, environment and innovation.

Upscale neighbourhood
The apartments surrounding the Green Square Plaza and the Drying Green are upmarket. In particular, The Frederick on Zetland Avenue, which was named after council mayor and alderman of the 1930s The Honourable Frederick Green and designed by architect William Smart of Smart Design Studio, is a landmark building visible kilometres away and where the level of luxury in the building has been "dialled up several notches" to be even higher than Mirvac's luxury buildings nearby reflecting rapid gentrification.

This apartment building, as well as Portman on the Park, will be the first buildings in Australia to seek WELLv2 Building Standard Certification, a global evidence-backed approach to measure the impact of the built environment on our physical and mental wellbeing. These buildings will be amongst the first in Australia to use KPMG’s newly developed, blockchain-based Building Assurance Solution (BAS) system. BAS was developed by KPMG and the Government of New South Wales, to provide a Trustworthy Index for buildings in NSW, storing detailed records from inception throughout its lifecycle on the materials and methods used, certifications achieved, and contractor details. This will enable regulators to track products from source to installation and to provide buyers with assurance about quality, as well as help insurers price risk and associated insurance premiums.

Zetland Avenue west 
Zetland Avenue west is a new tree-lined boulevard inspired by avenues in Manhattan with a long row of aligned traffic lights.

Ebsworth Street 
Ebsworth Street is Sydney’s first new high street in a century.

Green Square Library and Plaza 
Green Square Library and Plaza is an urban living room located at the heart of the Green Square Town Centre and includes a 3,000 sqm library and an 8,000sqm plaza. The commission was won through an anonymous global design competition with the scheme unanimously selected by the jury, which included Pritzker Prize winner Glenn Murcutt.

The library and plaza achieved a 5-star rating from the Green Building Council of Australia. Its sustainability features include a central wastewater system and a low energy displacement ventilation system within the library bookshelves. In response to its location within the water table, the underground library utilises a 3 layer waterproofing system.

Gunyama Park Aquatic and Recreation Centre 
The Gunyama Park Aquatic and Recreation Centre has taken out a public architecture award at the Australian Institute of Architects Awards. The jury described it as "playful work that inspires a consideration of how the enjoyment of water-based environments has developed the psyche of an entire culture". The centre's new pool, modelled on Sydney's iconic beaches, is the biggest built in Sydney since the 2000 Olympic Games. With lap pools, exercise areas and chillout zones, Gunyama Park is part of the city's commitment to build sustainable facilities that meet the diverse needs of the community.

Drying Green 
A 6,200 square metre park which is bound by Portman Street, Geddes Avenue, Paul Street and Zetland Avenue.

107 Projects 
Formerly called the Joynton Arts Creative Centre, 107 Projects was launched in 2018 and Joynton Avenue houses over 25 creative practitioners, organisations and start-ups; as well as supporting creative education programs, jewellery making, exhibitions and cultural events.

Green Square Primary School (completion in 2024) 
The new primary school will provide fit-for-purpose learning spaces and include additional facilities designed for both school and community use. Architect BVN's competition-winning design also includes spaces that can be used at night and on weekends by the broader community. The City of Sydney has committed $25 million towards the integrated community facilities that will be shared by local residents and businesses outside of school hours. The new school will be built on the old South Sydney Hospital site on Joynton Avenue. It will sit next to the Waranara Early Learning Centre, across the road from the Gunyama Park Aquatic Centre and close to the Green Square Library.

Railway Operations Centre (ROC) 
Sydney's entire rail network is controlled by the state-of-the-art Rail Operations Centre (ROC) which was built in 2019. The 2,000-square-metre, four-storey facility is located in Wyndham Street near Green Square.

Sydney Trains' ROC controls Sydney's rail network by incorporating many different systems into this single location. The ROC incorporates a 33m display screen which is the largest display screen in the Southern Hemisphere.

Demographics
The 2021 census revealed that residents in the area had the third-highest median personal income in Sydney at $1669 a week, almost 2x higher than the citywide figure of $881 per week. Only Double Bay-Darling Point and North Sydney-Lavender bay had slightly higher median personal incomes at $1690 a week (+1.2% higher) and $1683 a week (+0.8% higher) respectively. At the 2021 Census, there were approximately 34,253 residents in Green Square.  Almost 90% of the working residents were employed in white-collar jobs.

Health and wellness
According to the 2021 census, in Green Square 5.5% of residents have asthma, 1.3% have diabetes, and 0.4% have a lung condition – compared to NSW averages of 7.8%, 4.8%, and 1.7% respectively.

Mirvac high-rise apartments in Green Square have a high focus and emphasis on health and wellness, and in Green Square, 77% of residents have no long-term health condition - compared to 
69.6%, 67.9%, and 61% in Chatswood-Lane Cove, North Sydney-Lavender Bay, and New South Wales respectively. Notably, 4.8% of residents in the town centre precinct have a mental health condition - compared to 9.8% in Alexandria, 7.2% in Kensington, 6.1% in Chatswood-Lane Cove, 5.9% in North Sydney-Lavender Bay, 5.5% in Zetland, 8.0% in NSW, and 8.8% in Australia.

Partly due to the younger demographic, in Green Square, 1.8% of residents have arthritis, 0.9% have cancer, 1.2% have heart disease – compared to NSW averages of 8.4%, 2.8%, and 3.9% respectively.

In popular culture
A season of Beauty and the Geek Australia, which is an Australian reality television series was filmed in buildings in Green Square.

Transportation
Green Square railway station is an underground railway station served by the Airport & South Line. The area is well served by buses, passing through Green Square and Zetland.

Green Square Town Centre can be accessed by bicycle or on foot from South Eveleigh and the Sydney CBD.

See also
Two other large-scale, inner-city urban renewal projects in Sydney:
 Barangaroo, New South Wales
 Central Park, Sydney

References

External links 
City of Sydney – Green Square Urban Renewal Project

Sydney localities
Proposed buildings and structures in Australia
Squares in Australia
Waterloo, New South Wales